Kalashi Rural District is a rural district (dehestan) in Kalashi District, Javanrud County, Kermanshah Province, Iran. At the 2006 census, its population was 4,392, in 874 families. The rural district has 26 villages.

References 

Rural Districts of Kermanshah Province
Javanrud County